The Chernobyl disaster was a catastrophic nuclear disaster that occurred in the early hours of 26 April 1986, at the Chernobyl Nuclear Power Plant in Soviet Ukraine. The accident occurred when Reactor Number 4 exploded and destroyed most of the reactor building, spreading debris and radioactive material across the surrounding area, and over the following days and weeks, most of mainland Europe was contaminated with radionuclides that emitted dangerous amounts of ionising radiation. On the night of April 25th and the early hours of April 26th, there had been 160 personnel on duty across the facility, while 300 more workers were on site at the building site of reactors 5 and 6.

Individuals present on 26 April

Anatoly Stepanovich Dyatlov 

Dyatlov, the deputy chief engineer, supervised the test. At the moment the reactor power slipped to 30 MW, Dyatlov reported that he was out of the control room and inspecting equipment elsewhere in the plant. Dyatlov stated that Akimov and Toptunov were already raising power upon his return, and that had they not done so, he would have ordered them to. In testimony at the trial, several witnesses recalled Dyatlov remaining in the room at this point, but did not report any disagreements or "serious discussions" related to the increase in power or at any other point during the test.

The power was stabilized at 200 MW at around 1:00 a.m., and the turbine rundown test was begun. A little under a minute after the beginning of the test, Dyatlov reports that Toptunov pressed the AZ-5 (scram) button to shut down the reactor upon completion of the test, and in accordance with maintenance which had already been scheduled for the weekend of April 26–27. Approximately three seconds after the initiation of the scram, the reactor underwent a power excursion, rising to 520 MW (thermal). As the control rods dropped into the core, the graphite displacers that made up the last few meters of the rods introduced additional moderation and hence reactivity into the reactor system. The first shocks occurred as the control rods were falling, and the subsequent damage prevented their further insertion into the reactor. Dyatlov's first concern after the explosion was that an accident in the deaerators immediately above the control room could result in boiling water raining down from the ceiling. He ordered everyone to evacuate to the backup control room, but no other operators left the room and Dyatlov soon countermanded his instructions. Other plant workers arrived in the control room, reporting damage.

Dyatlov went to the backup control room, pressing the AZ-5 button there and disconnecting power to the control rod servodrives. He ordered Kudryavtsev and Proskuryakov to lower the jammed control rods by hand (rubble initially prevented them from carrying out these orders), which Dyatlov recalls as his only mistaken command from that night. After witnessing the fallen roof, fires and spilling oil in the Turbine Hall, Dyatlov ordered Akimov to call the fire brigade. In the corridor, he met Genrikh and Kurguz and sent them to the medical station. Realizing the magnitude of the disaster, Dyatlov suspended coolant supply to the reactor, although pumping of water would be resumed by order of Chief Engineer Nikolai Fomin around dawn. Dosimetrist Samoilenko reported that radiation levels in the lefthand and central sections of the control room were 500-800 μR/s (micro-Roentgen per second), while readings were off the charts (over 1000 μR/s or 3.6 Roentgen per hour) on the righthand side of the control room. Dyatlov ordered Akimov to send Toptunov and Kirschenbaum (everyone but Stolyarchuk and Akimov) to the Unit 3 control room because they were of no further use, but Toptunov ultimately returned to the control room to retrieve the operator's log and remained on duty at Unit 4. Around 3:00a.m., Dyatlov instructed Babishev to relieve Akimov on duty, but Akimov also remained at his post.

Dyatlov ran to the control room of Block 3 and instructed Rogozhkin to shut down reactor 3, overriding the latter's objections that Bryukhanov's permission was needed. Dyatlov then returned to control room 4 and ordered Akimov to call the daytime shift and get people to the affected unit; namely Lelechenko, whose crew had to remove hydrogen from the generator 8 electrolyzer. Dyatlov then received the report of Perevozchenko that pump operator Khodemchuk was still unaccounted for. Perevozchenko led Dyatlov and Aleksandr Yuvchenko on a brief and unsuccessful search for Khodemchuk, in corridors where the 1000 μR/s dosimeters maxed out. Also during the night, Dyatlov and Yuri Tregub went to survey the plant from the outside. Tregub recalled telling him "This is Hiroshima," to which Dyatlov replied, "Not in my nightmares have I seen anything like this." Around 5:00a.m., already feeling ill, Dyatlov made a brief report to Bryukhanov in the Civil Defense Bunker, showing him the final printouts of reactor parameters leading up to the explosion. Dyatlov did not report the destruction of the reactor, but speculated that the accident was due to some malfunction of the Control and Protection System. Dyatlov was overcome by weakness and nausea in the bunker and went to the medical unit with Gorbachenko. Fomin replaced him at his post with Anatoly Sitnikov.

Aleksandr Akimov 

Akimov, the unit shift chief, was in charge of the test itself. He took over the shift at midnight from Tregub, who stayed on-site. 

At 1:23:04 a.m., the test began, and the main circulation pumps started cavitating due to the extremely high temperature of inlet water. The coolant started boiling in the reactor, and because of a combination of a positive void co-efficient and xenon burnout, the power began to increase dramatically. At 1:23:43 a.m., Akimov pressed the AZ-5 button, to SCRAM the reactor. The increased reactivity caused coolant water in the reactor to rapidly vaporize into steam. Akimov disconnected the clutches of the control rod servos to let the rods descend into the core by their own weight, but the rods did not move. The reactor control panel indicated no water flow and failure of pumps. In the seconds after pressing the AZ-5 button, the reactor descended into an uncontrolled reaction that pushed the thermal power output to at least 530MW, but Valery Legasov, in his report to the International Atomic Energy Agency indicated that the thermal power may have exceeded 30,000MW in the seconds before it exploded.

The explosion occurred, the air filled with dust, power went out, and only battery-powered emergency lights stayed in operation. Perevozchenko ran into the control room, reporting the collapse of the reactor top. Brazhnik ran in from the turbine hall, reporting fire there. Brazhnik, Akimov, Davletbayev, and Palamarchuk ran into the turbine hall, having seen scattered debris and multiple fires on levels 0 and +12. Akimov called the fire station and the chiefs of electrical and other departments, asking for electrical power for coolant pumps, removal of hydrogen from the generators, and other emergency procedures to stabilize the plant and contain the damage. 

Internal telephone lines were disabled; Akimov sent Palamarchuk to contact Gorbachenko. Kudryavtsev and Proskuryakov returned from the reactor and reported its state to Akimov and Dyatlov. Insisting the reactor was intact, Akimov ordered Stolyarchuk and Busygin to turn on the emergency feedwater pumps. Davletbayev reported loss of electrical power, torn cables, and electric arcs. Akimov sent Metlenko to help in the turbine hall with manual opening of the cooling system valves, which was expected to take at least four hours per valve. 

At 3:30 a.m., Telyatnikov contacted Akimov, asking what was happening to his firemen; Akimov sent him a dosimetrist. Akimov, already nauseated, was replaced at 6 a.m., by the unit chief Vladimir Alekseyevich Babychev. Despite this, Akimov, together with Toptunov, stayed in the plant. Believing the water flow to the reactor to be blocked by a closed valve somewhere, they went to the half-destroyed feedwater room on level +24.

Together with Nekhayev, Orlov, and Uskov, they opened the valves on the two feedwater lines, then climbed over to level +27 and, almost knee-deep in a mixture of fuel and water, opened two valves on the 300 line. Due to advancing radiation poisoning caused by a dose of over 15 Grays (4 being the LD50), they did not have the strength to open the valves on the sides. Akimov and Toptunov spent several hours turning valves; the radioactive water in room 712 was half submerging the pipeline. Viktor Smagin went in to open the third valves, spent 20 minutes in the room, and received 2.8 grays. Akimov was evacuated to the hospital. Until his death, he insisted he had done everything correctly and had made no mistakes.

Nikolai Gorbachenko 

Gorbachenko, a radiation monitoring technician, began his shift and checked in unit 3; he skipped the check of unit 4 as it was being shut down, so at the moment of the accident he was located in the duty room.

A flat and powerful thud shook the building; he and his assistant Pshenichnikov thought it was a water hammer occurring during a turbine shutdown. Another flat thud followed, accompanied by lights going out, the control panel of unit 4 losing signal, latched double doors being blown apart by the blast, and black and red powder falling from the ventilation; emergency lights then switched on. Telephone connection with unit 4 was cut.

The corridor to the deaerator galleries was full of steam and white dust. The radiation counters went off-scale, and the high-range one burned out when switched on; the portable instruments were capable of showing at most 4 roentgens per hour (36 nA/kg), while the radiation on the roof ranged between 2,000 and 15,000 roentgens per hour (18 and 130 μA/kg). He went to the turbine hall to survey the damage, saw scattered pieces of concrete, and returned to the duty room.

Meeting two men there, together with them he went to search for Vladimir Shashenok, found him unconscious in a damaged instrument room and carried him down. Gorbachenko returned to his post and changed clothes and shoes. He was then ordered to look for Valery Khodemchuk, but couldn't find him. He went to the control room and with Anatoly Dyatlov went outside to survey the reactor building. At 5 a.m., he began feeling weak and vomiting and was transported to a hospital, from where he was released on 27 October.

Valery Khodemchuk 

Khodemchuk, the night shift main circulating pump operator, was likely killed immediately; he was stationed in the collapsed part of the building, in the far end of the southern main circulating pumps engine room at level +10. His body was never recovered and is entombed in the nuclear reactor's debris.

Vladimir Shashenok 
Shashenok, the automatic systems adjuster from Atomenergonaladka—the Chernobyl startup and adjustment enterprise—was supposed to be in room 604, the location of the measurement and control instruments, on the upper landing across the turbine room, on level +24, under the reactor feedwater unit; he was reporting the states of the pressure gauges of the profile of the multiple forced circulation circuits to the computer room by telephone.

The communication lines were cut during the explosion. Shashenok received deep thermal and radiation burns over his entire body when the overpressure spike destroyed the isolation membranes and the impulse pipes of the manometers in his instrument room just before the explosion, which then demolished the room itself. The landing was found damaged, covered with ankle-deep water, and there were leaks of boiling water and radioactive steam. Shashenok was found unconscious in room 604, pinned under a fallen beam, with bloody foam coming out of his mouth.

His body was severely contaminated by radioactive water. He was carried out by Gorbachenko and Pyotr Palamarchuk and died at 6 a.m. in the Pripyat hospital under care of the chief physician, Vitaly Leonenko, without regaining consciousness. Gorbachenko suffered a radiation burn on his back where Shashenok's hand was located when he helped carry him out. Khodemchuk and Shashenok were the first two victims of the disaster. A report by the Associated Press at the time, citing Soviet newspaper Pravda, claimed that Shashenok was buried two days later at a village near Chernobyl. His wife Lyudmilla had been evacuated before the burial and was not there.  A year later he was exhumed and re-buried beside his 29 fellow workers at Moscow's Mitinskoe Cemetery.

Oleg Genrikh and Anatoly Kurguz 
Genrikh, an operator of the control room on level +36, was taking a nap in a windowless room adjacent to the control room. The window in the control room was broken and the lights went out. His colleague Kurguz was in the control room with three open doors between him and the reactor room; at the moment of the explosion, he suffered severe burns from steam entering the control room. 
Genrikh received less serious burns as he was protected by the windowless room. The stairs on the right side were damaged; he managed to escape by the stairs on the left. On the way back they were joined by Simeonov and Simonenko, the gas loop operators, all four heading to the control room. Kurguz was shortly afterwards evacuated by an ambulance; aware of dangers of radiation contamination, Genrikh took a shower and changed his clothes.

Aleksandr Yuvchenko 
The lights went out. He met a badly burned, drenched and shocked Viktor Degtyarenko, who asked him to rescue Khodemchuk; that quickly proved impossible as that part of the building did not exist anymore. Yuvchenko, together with the foreman Yuri Tregub, ran out of the building and saw half of the building gone and the reactor emitting a blue ionized air glow. They returned to the building and met Valeri Perevozchenko and two junior technicians, Kudryavtsev and Proskuryakov, ordered by Dyatlov to manually lower the presumably seized control rods. Tregub went to report the extent of damage to the control room.

The four climbed a stairwell to level 35 to survey the damage; Yuvchenko held open the massive door into the reactor room and the other three proceeded in to locate the control rod mechanism; after no more than a minute in the hallway near the entrance to the reactor hall, all three had sustained fatal doses of radiation.

The three would later die in the Moscow hospital. Yuvchenko meanwhile suffered serious beta burns and gamma burns to his left shoulder, hip and calf as he kept the radioactive-dust-covered door open. It was later estimated he received a dose of 4.1 Sv. At 3 a.m., he began vomiting intensely; by 6 a.m., he could no longer walk. He later spent a year in the Moscow hospital receiving blood and plasma transfusions and received numerous skin grafts. Yuvchenko died of leukemia in November 2008, aged 47.

Valery Perevozchenko 

Perevozchenko, the reactor section foreman, was in the company of Alexander Yuvchenko shortly before the explosion. While both men were returning from Unit 3, Perevozchenko was called to the Unit 4 control room, arriving shortly after the explosions. He then returned to search for his comrades. He witnessed the destruction of the reactor building from the broken windows of the deaerator gallery.

With his face already tanned by the radiation, he went to the dosimetry room and asked Gorbachenko for radiation levels; Gorbachenko left with Palamarchuk to rescue Shashenok while Perevozchenko went through the graphite and fuel containing radioactive rubble on level 10 to the remains of room 306 in an unsuccessful attempt to locate Khodemchuk, close to debris emitting over 10,000 roentgens per hour (90 μA/kg). He then went to the control room of Genrikh and Kurguz and found it empty; vomiting and losing consciousness, he returned to the control room to report on the situation.

Vyacheslav Brazhnik, Pyotr Palamarchuk and Razim Davletbayev 
Brazhnik, the senior turbine machinist operator, ran into the control room to report fire in the turbine hall. Palamarchuk, the Chernobyl enterprise group supervisor, together with Davletbayev, followed him back to the turbine room. They witnessed fires on levels 0 and +12, broken oil and water pipes, roof debris on top of turbine 7, and scattered pieces of reactor graphite and fuel, with the linoleum on the floor burning around them.

Palamarchuk unsuccessfully attempted to contact Sashenok in room 604, then ran around the turbo generator 8, down to level 0 and urged the two men from the Kharkov mobile laboratory, assigned to record the turbine 8 vibrations, to leave; they, however, had both already received a lethal radiation dose. Akimov asked Palamarchuk to look for Gorbachenko and then rescue Sashenok as the communication with the dosimetry room was cut. Palamarchuk met Gorbachenko by the staircase on level +27, then they together found and recovered Shashenok's unconscious body.

Aleksandr Kudryavtsev and Viktor Proskuryakov 

Kudryavtsev and Proskuryakov, the SIUR trainees from other shifts, were present to watch Toptunov. After the explosion they were sent by Dyatlov to the central hall to turn the handles of the system for manual lowering of the presumably seized control rods. They ran through the de-aerator gallery to the right to the VRSO unit elevator, found it destroyed, so climbed up the staircase instead, towards level 36; they missed Kurguz and Genrikh, who used another stairwell. Level 36 was destroyed, covered with rubble.

They met Perevozchenko and Yuvchenko, then went through a narrow corridor towards the central hall. Proskuryakov shone a flashlight around the corner into the reactor hall, which later resulted in severe burns appearing on his hand.

Viktor Bryukhanov 

Bryukhanov, the plant manager, arrived at 2:30 a.m. Akimov reported a serious radiation accident but intact reactor, fires in the process of being extinguished, and a second emergency water pump being readied to cool the reactor. Due to limitations of available instruments, they seriously underestimated the radiation level. At 3 a.m., Bryukhanov called Maryin, the deputy secretary for the nuclear power industry, reporting Akimov's version of the situation.

Maryin sent the message further up the chain of command, to Frolyshev, who then called Vladimir Dolgikh. Dolgikh subsequently called General Secretary Mikhail Gorbachev and other members of the Politburo. At 4 a.m., Moscow ordered feeding of water to the reactor. As Director of the Chernobyl site, Bryukhanov was sentenced to ten years imprisonment but only served five years of the sentence.

The first director of the Chernobyl nuclear power plant, Viktor Petrovich Bryukhanov, died on October 13, 2021 at the age of 84.

Nikolai Fomin 

Fomin, the chief engineer, arrived in the block 4 control room at 4:30 a.m. He ordered continuous feeding of water into the reactor, which was already in progress by emergency pump 2 from the deaerators. Fomin kept pressing the staff to feed water to the reactor and transferred more people to unit 4 to replace those being disabled by radiation. 

After Dyatlov was evacuated by ambulance, Fomin, Bryukhanov and Parashin sent Sitnikov to assess damage around Unit 4. Sitnikov is often reported to have visited the roof of Unit 3 to look down into the destroyed central hall, but this is disputed and no report to this effect was made back to the bunker. Sitnikov then assisted Akimov and Toptunov with feeding water into the reactor; the water, however, flowed through the severed pipes into the lower levels of the plant, carrying radioactive debris and causing short circuits in the cableways common to all four blocks.

Later, before the trial, Fomin suffered a mental breakdown and tried to kill himself by breaking his glasses and slitting his wrists with the shards. He was found guilty of criminal mismanagement in 1988 for his role in causing the disaster, and sentenced to 10 years in prison.

Engineers who drained the steam suppression pool on 28 April 
On 28 April 1986, three engineers completed a multi-day effort to drain water from the steam suppression pool beneath the reactor. Plant engineers Alexei Ananenko, Valeri Bespalov, and Boris Baranov wore wetsuits and entered an underground corridor on the edge of the reactor building, an area that had become filled with firefighting water and coolant water, to locate and open release valves to drain the water. Some members of the government commission were concerned that melting fuel would reach the water and spread contaminated steam around the site, possibly even leading to an explosion.

Despite wading through contaminated water, all three survived the mission, and in 2018 were awarded the Order For Courage by Ukrainian President Petro Poroshenko. During the April 2018 ceremony, with the Chernobyl New Safe Confinement structure in the background, Poroshenko noted that the three men had been quickly forgotten at the time, with the Soviet news agency still hiding many of the details of the catastrophe. It had previously been reported that all three had died and been buried in "tightly sealed zinc coffins." Ananenko and Bespalov received their awards in person, while Baranov, who died in 2005 of a heart attack, was awarded his posthumously.

Table

Legacy 
Two decades after the accident, the Chernobyl Forum Report showed that the first responders and clean-up workers, who were the people exposed to the highest level of radiations, still had the highest rates of depression and post-traumatic stress disorder.

See also 
 Deaths due to the Chernobyl disaster
 List of Chernobyl-related articles

References

 
Victims of radiological poisoning